The Surprises of an Empty Hotel is a 1916 American silent film written by Jasper Ewing Brady, directed by Theodore Marston, and starring Charles Richman, Charles Eldridge and Leo Delaney.

Cast list

Production
The film was in production by October 1915.  For one of the scenes, Vitagraph blew up a motor yacht off of Staten Island in Princess Bay.  The 100-foot yacht, the Wayward had been a racing yacht, having won several races in Bermuda.  In early January 1916 it was announced that the picture would be released on January 10.

References

American black-and-white films
American silent films
Vitagraph Studios films
Films directed by Theodore Marston
1910s American films